The Fantasy Air Allegro is a Czech two seat, high wing, tricycle gear, single engine monoplane light-sport aircraft or microlight originally designed and built by Fantasy Air and later produced in the United States by Allegro LSA.

Development
The Allegro has a strut-braced wing constructed from aluminum, with fibreglass wingtips. The 2000 and 2007 variants have a 10:1 aspect ratio wing that tapers outboard of the flaps, while the shorter-winged SW model has non-tapered wings. The wings are equipped with three position electrically-actuated flaps with positions for 0, 15 and 48 degrees for cruising flight, take-off and landing respectively on the 2000 model and -4.5, 15 and 48 degrees on the 2007 model. The ailerons are of a differential design. The airfoil is an SM 701.

The fuselage is constructed from Kevlar-reinforced fibreglass with steel tube reinforcement in the cockpit area. The seating is for pilot and passenger in side-by-side configuration, sharing a centre-mounted control stick. The landing gear is of tricycle configuration, with curved main gear legs made from fibreglass and a nosewheel mounted on steel tubes with rubber puck shock absorbing. There is also a shock-absorbing tail skid mounted under the fin. While the fin is fibreglass the horizontal stabilizer, elevator and adjustable trim tab mounted as a T-tail are all aluminum.

Engines available for the 2000 include the  Rotax 912ULS,  Rotax 912UL and the  Rotax 582. The 2007 model offers only the Rotax 912UL and ULS. A glider-towing kit is optional which allows towing gliders up to  gross weight.

The design of the Allegro 2000 model has been praised for its aesthetic appeal, good cockpit visibility, light controls, operating economics and value, wide speed range, range and payload as well as enjoyable flight characteristics. It has been criticized for its poor ergonomic accommodation for taller pilots and also for poor control harmony, with the elevator controls much lighter than the ailerons, which are in turn much lighter than the rudder pedals.

The aircraft can be flown under the microlight/ultralight regulations of several countries as well as the USA FAA Light-sport Aircraft rules. In Canada the aircraft can be registered as a Basic Ultralight or Advanced Ultralight.

Variants

Cora
Original variant first flown in 1995
Allegro 2000
Production variant with tapered-wings and gross weight of 
Allegro 2000F
Floatplane variant, with provisions for Full Lotus inflatable floats
Allegro SW
The SW model has a cruise speed that is  slower than the taper-winged models with the same power.
Allegro 2007
 
Allegro LSA
Light-sport aircraft variant built in the United States by AllegroLSA of Sanford, North Carolina. This model incorporates a taller cockpit, along with aerodynamic improvements that reduce the amount of rudder needed in a turn. Fuel capacity was increased to 
Allegro F
Floatplane version made in the USA by B-Bar-D Aviation.

Specifications (Allegro 2007)

References

External links

1990s Czech and Czechoslovakian civil utility aircraft
1990s United States civil utility aircraft
Light-sport aircraft
Single-engined tractor aircraft
High-wing aircraft
Aircraft first flown in 1995